Norman Munnoch (born 4 January 1929 in Polmont, Scotland) is a former Scotland international rugby union player. Munnoch played as a Hooker.

Rugby union career

Amateur career

Munnoch played for Watsonians.

He also played for the RAF rugby union team.

Provincial career

Munnoch played for Edinburgh District in the 1950-51 Inter-City match against Glasgow District on 2 December 1950. Glasgow won the Inter-City 11 pts to 3 pts.

Munnoch played for Edinburgh District in the 1951-52 Inter-City match against Glasgow District on 1 December 1951. Glasgow won the Inter-City 6 pts to 3 pts.

International career

He was capped for  three times in 1952, all of the caps coming in the Five Nations matches.

References

1929 births
Living people
Scottish rugby union players
Scotland international rugby union players
Watsonians RFC players
Edinburgh District (rugby union) players
Royal Air Force rugby union players
Rugby union players from Falkirk (council area)
Rugby union hookers